Malmö Opera (Swedish: Malmö opera) is an opera house in Malmö, Sweden.  An opera company of the same name presents seasons of opera in this house.

Built 1933-1944 by architect Sigurd Lewerentz and, until 1992, known as the Malmö City Theatre accommodating several different organizations, the Opera House is one of the largest auditoriums in Scandinavia with 1,508 seats, created in the form of an enclosed amphitheatre in order to allow for the greatest viewing possibility. It is used for opera, operetta, and musical performances. Influenced by German director Max Reinhardt, a large revolving stage was constructed.

The foyer is considered to be beautiful, with its open surfaces and marble staircases, and it is adorned with a number of works of art by artists such as Carl Milles and Isaac Grünewald.

An offshoot of the opera company, whose musical director was Gintaras Rinkevicius and Joseph Swensen 2006-2011, is the program of opera designed for participants under the age of 19. This is known as Operaverkstan; it also plans to introduce classic operas for its audience, and sometimes children participate in the productions.

Other Swedish Opera Houses of Note 
Royal Swedish Opera
Gothenburg opera house
Norrland Opera
Drottningholm Palace Theatre

External links
Official site

Opera houses in Sweden
Listed buildings in Malmö
Swedish opera companies
1944 establishments in Sweden
Theatres completed in 1944
Music venues completed in 1944